Antipas, officially the Municipality of Antipas (Jawi: ايڠايد نو انتيڤاس), is a 2nd class municipality in the province of Cotabato, Philippines. According to the 2020 census, it has a population of 26,817 people.

History
The Municipality of Antipas long before its creation into a regular municipality was just a mere sitio called Buru-Buruan of Barangay Kiyaab of the Municipality of Matalam which is inhabited mostly by Manobos. Due to continuous influx of Christian settlers in the area, the Municipal Council of Matalam passed a resolution in 1963, approved by the defunct Provincial Board of Cotabato and then was consequently recognized as one of the regular barangays of Matalam, Cotabato bearing the name of ANTIPAS.

The name Antipas was derived from "anti" from the word antique and "pas" from Passi, two places found in Panay Island. The enthusiasm of the natives and their determination to run their own affairs coupled with the fertility of the soil and a promise of a brighter future of the area brought forth the unified will of the people when they petitioned the National Government through the Provincial Government headed by Governor Carlos B. Cajelo and represented by Assemblyman Jesus Amparo of the Batasang Pambansa. On October 14, 1980, by virtue of Batas Pambansa Bilang 88, approved by President Ferdinand Marcos, ratified by the people of the Municipality of Matalam on December 6, 1980, and ultimately inaugurated on March 7, 1981, Antipas was created as the 15th municipality of Cotabato.

Geography

Antipas is centrally located at the heart of Arakan Valley. It is bounded on the southeast by the Municipality of Magpet, on the north-east by the Municipality of Arakan, on the north by the Municipality of President Roxas (north) and Arakan River, on the west by its mother municipality, Matalam and on the south by President Roxas (south).

Barangays
Antipas is politically subdivided into 13 barangays.
 Camutan
 Canaan
 Dolores
 Kiy'aab
 Luhong
 Magsaysay
 Malangag
 Malatab
 Malire
 New Pontevedra
 Poblacion
 B. Cadungon
 Datu Agod

Climate

Antipas belongs to the "4" type of climate characterized by a distribution of rainfall throughout the year, with an average rainfall of 267 mm. The heaviest rainfalls frequently occur during the months of May, June, July and August. Antipas being centrally located at the heart of Arakan Valley is protected by the majestic Mount Apo from typhoons and other climatic disturbances. Prevailing wind directions are the Northeast and Southwest monsoon.

Temperature ranges from 23 to 32 degrees Celsius, because of its topographic elevation of 320 meters above sea level and proximity to mountainous Bukidnon province, making it one of the cool places in Soccsksargen. The highest temperature is felt during the months of March and April, while the lowest is in December. The long dry season usually lasts from January to April, during which months there is also a marked decrease in water supply for agricultural purposes when some water sources dry up, affecting agricultural productivity. During the peak rainy season, some rivers/creeks overflow, causing low-lying areas to flood.

Demographics

Dialects

The major dialects spoken is Hiligaynon o Ilonggo which comprises the 74% of the population. Second to this is Cebuano, 12% and Ilocano, 7.9%. Ethnic tribes account for the 6.1% of the population.

Economy

Antipas was classified as a 2nd class municipality by the DILG-LGMPS in 2011. It yielded an income of Php 87,510,519.00, where Php 80,567,780.00 is from IRA and Php 6,942,739.00 from Local-Sourced Revenues.
The municipality is considered the economic center of Arakan Valley Complex. It plays a pivotal role in the economic development on its neighboring towns. It is the commercial, industrial and trading hub of four neighboring municipalities.

Rubber and cavendish banana production are the major crops. A major company engaged in Cavendish production in the area is AJMR/SUMIFRU Philippines. Other industries present in the area deal with agriculture support facilities such as rice mill, corn mills, corn sheller and drier. Some furniture making, tailoring and welding are also present within the locality. The palm oil industry is now also in the rise as businessmen and farmers venture further in finding ways on how to utilize their lands effectively.

Natural resources

Antipas is predominantly an agriculture area. Antipas is identified as a major banana-, corn- and rubber-producing area in relation to soil type and soil capability dominant in the area. Coupled with these is the potential of the area for agri-based industries like cassava, coconut and rubber, rice, coffee and cacao.

Transportation

Local means of transportation is served by tricycles known locally as just "motor". Transportation to its barangays and adjacent municipalities is served by motorcycles, Jeepneys, and L300 Vans. Mini-Buses serves the Arakan—Kidapawan City Route which passes the municipalities of Antipas and President Roxas. Public Utility Vans also served routes to and from the municipalities of Arakan, President Roxas, Barangay Linao and Kiyaab of Antipas and Kidapawan City.

Healthcare
 Antipas Medical Specialist Center Hospital, Inc.
 Arakan Valley District Hospital
 Clinica Catotal

Education

Tertiary
 Cotabato Foundation College of Science and Technology (CFCST)- Antipas Annex
 St. Uriel School, Inc.
 Untalan Institute of Technology

High schools
Public schools:
 Antipas National High School - Main Campus
 Antipas National High School - Malire Annex
 Antipas Educational Learning Center
 Camutan High School
 Malatab High School

Private schools:
 SBC Learning Center
 St. Uriel School, INC.
 Untalan Institute of Technology

Elementary
Public schools:

Private schools:
 SBC Learning Center
 St. Uriel School, Inc.
 Montessori

References

External links
Antipas official website
 Antipas Profile at the DTI Cities and Municipalities Competitive Index
 [ Philippine Standard Geographic Code]
Philippine Census information

Municipalities of Cotabato